VKM or vkm may refer to:

Science and technology
 Vehicle keeper marking, railcar registration mark
 Vehicle-kilometre,  measure of traffic flow 
 All-Russia Collection of Microorganisms (Vserossiyskaya kollektsiya mikroorganizmov), microbiological culture collection
 ISO 639-3 code for the Kamakan language
 Norwegian Scientific Committee for Food and Environment

Other uses
 Vasant Kanya Mahavidyalaya, women's college in Varanasi, India
 Vincent Kennedy McMahon, former chairman and chief executive officer of WWE
 Voodoo Kin Mafia, wrestling tag team (a play on the initials of Vincent Kennedy McMahon)
 , German dwarfism organization